The Sava is a river in central Europe.

Sava or SAVA may also refer to:

Places

Bulgaria
 Sava, Bulgaria, a village in Dalgopol

Estonia
 Sava, Estonia, village in Luunja Parish, Tartu County

Iran
 Sava, Iran, a city in Markazi Province

Italy
 Sava, Apulia, a commune in the province of Taranto, Apulia
 Sava (Baronissi), a village in the province of Salerno, Campania

Madagascar
 Sava Region

Mauritania
 Sava, Mauritania, a village

Romania
 Sava, Pălatca, a village in Pălatca Commune, Cluj County
 Sava River (Beznea), a tributary of the Beznea river

Serbia
 Lake Sava, a lake in Belgrade
 Sava Centar, an event facility in Belgrade
 Sava City, business district under construction in Belgrade

Slovenia
 Sava (Jesenice), a settlement that is now part of the town of Jesenice
 Sava, Litija, a settlement in the Municipality of Litija

People
 Sava (name), a south Slavic name
 Sabbas the Goth (334–372), Romanian martyr
 Sabbas the Sanctified (439–532), Palestinian hermit, author of the Typicon
 Saint Sava (1169 or 1174–1236), Serbian medieval prince turned monk

Organisations
 Sava (cycling team), a Slovenian cycling team
 Sava (Spain), a defunct Spanish car manufacturer
 Southern African Vexillological Association
 Sava Tires, a Slovenian tire brand, part of the Goodyear Tire and Rubber Company

Other uses
 Sava (mythology), a creature in Polynesian mythology
 Sava (insect), a genus of assassin bugs in the tribe Harpactorini
 Sava-class submarine, a class of Yugoslav submarines built during the late 1970s and early 1980s.
 Yugoslav submarine Sava, commissioned 1949, stricken 1971
 Yugoslav monitor Sava, formerly SMS Bodrog, the ship which fired the opening shots of the First World War